John Drew (August 10, 1940 – February 24, 1997) was an American politician.

Drew lived in Saint Paul, Minnesota. He went to Central High School in Saint Paul and to University of Minnesota. He served in the United States Army and was involved in the insurance business. Drew served on the Ramsey County Commission and was a Republican. He also served in the Minnesota House of Representatives from 1979 to 1982. Drew then served on the Saint Paul City Council from 1984 to 1988. In 1988, Drew and his wife moved  to Mille Lacs Lake near Garrison, Minnesota, in Crow Wing County, Minnesota where they had owned the Rainbow Inn resort. He died from a heart attack in a hospital in St. Cloud, Minnesota and was buried at the Fort Snelling National Cemetery.

References

1940 births
1997 deaths
People from Crow Wing County, Minnesota
Politicians from Saint Paul, Minnesota
Military personnel from Minnesota
Businesspeople from Minnesota
Minnesota city council members
County commissioners in Minnesota
Republican Party members of the Minnesota House of Representatives